West Port can refer to:
West Port, Edinburgh, Scotland
West Port, Malaysia

See also
West Port murders, Edinburgh, Scotland
West Port High School, Florida, United States
Westport (disambiguation)